Paraplatyptilia sibirica is a moth of the family Pterophoridae that is endemic to Russia (South Siberian Mountains and the mountains of north-eastern Siberia).

References

Moths described in 1983
sibirica
Endemic fauna of Russia